Greenland is a 2020 American disaster thriller film directed by Ric Roman Waugh and written by Chris Sparling. The film stars Gerard Butler (who also produced), Morena Baccarin, Roger Dale Floyd, Scott Glenn, David Denman, and Hope Davis, and follows a family who must fight for survival as a planet-destroying comet races to Earth.

Originally scheduled to be theatrically released in the United States, Greenland was delayed several times due to the COVID-19 pandemic. The film was released domestically by STXfilms, through video on demand on December 18, 2020, and then played on HBO Max and Amazon Prime. It was still released theatrically in other territories, beginning with Belgium on July 29, 2020. The film received generally positive reviews from critics and grossed $52.3 million worldwide with a production budget of $35 million. A sequel, Greenland: Migration, is in development, with Waugh, Butler, Baccarin and Floyd all returning.

Plot
Structural engineer John Garrity lives in Atlanta, Georgia with his estranged wife, Allison, and their diabetic son, Nathan. He returns home to watch the near-earth passing of a recently-discovered interstellar comet named "Clarke", along with his family and neighbors.

While at the grocery store, John receives an automated DHS message saying that he and his family have been selected for emergency sheltering. He then returns home just as a comet fragment is seen entering the atmosphere on live television. Previously expected to land in the ocean near Bermuda, the fragment instead strikes Tampa, Florida, vaporizing the city along with most of the state. John then receives a call with instructions to head to Robins Air Force Base for an evacuation flight, as Clarke is on a direct collision course with Earth and the entire planet will be bombarded with hundreds of fragments over the next two days in a cataclysmic event, with one fragment large enough to cause an extinction-level event. John, Allison, and Nathan pack up and flee, unable to take anyone else with them as they would be denied boarding.

At Robins Air Force Base, Nathan's insulin is left behind in the car. As John goes to retrieve it, Allison is escorted off the base after Nathan's medical condition is discovered, disqualifying him. John returns and boards a plane but quickly jumps off upon realizing Allison and Nathan were left behind. 

As John exits the base, a panicked mob breaks in, destroying several evacuation planes when gunfire ignites jet fuel. Returning to the car, John finds Allison's note saying she and Nathan are going to her father's home in Lexington, Kentucky. After getting medical supplies from a looted store, Allison and Nathan get a ride from a couple named Ralph and Judy Vento, only for Ralph to kidnap Nathan in order to use him and the wristbands to board a flight. Quickly, Allison tries to get help, but everyone is too busy and passes her and a now hopeless Allison starts crying.

John hitches a ride on a truck where a young man named Colin says it is headed to Osgoode, Ontario, Canada where private planes are flying to Greenland, the apparent evacuation site. However, another man attempts to take John's wristband, causing the truck to crash and kill Colin, and John is forced to kill the man in self-defense. At another airport, the Ventos attempt to pose as Nathan's parents, but are arrested when the soldiers discover that Nathan is not theirs. Allison and Nathan are reunited shortly after at a nearby FEMA camp. The following morning, John learns that millions have died in global impacts and that the largest fragment will hit in approximately 24 hours.

Stealing a car, John reaches his father-in-law, Dale's house, and Nathan and Allison arrive shortly after. The family learn about a complex of underground bunkers near Thule Air Force Base in Greenland where the evacuees are being sent. The family has just enough time to reach Osgoode, so John and Allison decide to go while Dale chooses to stay behind and die in the impact, while giving them his truck. Reaching Upstate New York, the family is caught in a traffic jam. As a shower of molten debris rains down, they take refuge below an underpass, then continue on to Canada. The family arrives at the Osgoode airport barely in time to board that night's last flight out. As they reach Greenland, a comet fragment strikes off the coast, and the shockwave causes the plane to crash-land, killing the pilots. The Garritys and the rest of the passengers flag down a military truck and enter the bunker complex right as the largest fragment enters the atmosphere and hits, devastating civilization.

Nine months later, the bunkers attempt to make radio contact with other potential survivors as various cities are shown in total ruin, including Sydney, Chicago, Paris, and Mexico City. The Garritys and other occupants exit the shelter to a radically changed landscape, and Greenland makes contact with other stations around the globe. All are relieved to hear each other and report that the atmosphere is finally clearing, giving the survivors the chance to rebuild.

Cast

Production
In May 2018, Chris Evans joined the cast of the film, with Neill Blomkamp directing from a screenplay by Chris Sparling. In February 2019, it was announced Blomkamp would no longer direct the film. That same month, Ric Roman Waugh joined the project as director, with Gerard Butler being added to the cast of the film, replacing Blomkamp and Evans respectively, with Butler producing under his G-Base banner. In June 2019, Morena Baccarin joined the cast of the film. In July 2019, Scott Glenn, Andrew Bachelor and Roger Dale Floyd also joined, as did David Denman, in August.

Principal photography began in June 2019 and wrapped up on August 16 of the same year in Atlanta.

David Buckley, who previously worked with Waugh on Angel Has Fallen, composed the film's score.

Release
In March 2019, STX Entertainment acquired distribution rights to the film. It was originally scheduled to be theatrically released on June 12, 2020, but was delayed to July 30, 2020, and then August 14, 2020, due to the COVID-19 pandemic. Its domestic release was again delayed on July 24, moving to September 25, 2020. The film's release schedule includes Belgium (July 29), France (August 5), and Scandinavia (August 12). On September 14, it was announced the film's American release has been delayed again, this time to sometime later in 2020.

On September 30, the studio announced the film would be skipping theaters and going to be available to buy via video on demand on October 13, before being made available to rent on October 27. The following day, the studio announced the film had its U.S. pay TV and streaming rights sold to HBO for $20–30 million, who will release it in early 2021 and have it stream on HBO Max and Amazon Prime for the United Kingdom, Canada, and Australia releases. It was later reported the VOD release date had been pushed to December 18. The studio spent an estimated $10 million promoting the film domestically.

Reception

Box office and VoD
Greenland was first released in Belgium, making $73,112 from 55 theaters on its opening weekend. On its first day of release in France, the film made $255,000 with 31,000 tickets sold, 61% ahead of Butler's Olympus Has Fallen (2013) despite fewer theaters and tight COVID-19 restrictions. Overall, it debuted to $1.09 million in the country, with a 10-day international total of $1.3 million. In its third weekend of international release, the film finished first in nine countries and made a total of $2.82 million. In November the film opened in China and Mexico, debuting to $3.4 million and $882,000, respectively; the running global total was $43.1 million.

Upon the film's VOD release in the United States, it was the second-most rented on FandangoNow, and third on Apple TV and Google Play. The film remained near the top of rental charts into February, finishing first at both Google Play and Apple TV. In February 24, IndieWire estimated the film had already netted STX Films $60–80 million in profit, including around $32 million from two million PVOD rentals.

Critical response
The website's critics consensus reads: "Beware, comets of Greenland: Gerard Butler is here to protect Earth – and show audiences an improbably entertaining time." On Metacritic, it has a weighted average score of 64 out of 100 based on 25 critics, indicating "generally favorable reviews".

Writing for the Chicago Sun-Times, Richard Roeper gave the film three out of four stars, saying, "Unlike the typical, effects-laden, comet-threatens-the-planet B-movie, Greenland is more in the vein of Steven Spielberg's War of the Worlds, with the scenes of chaos and destruction serving as the backdrop for the story of one family's desperate quest for survival — even when circumstances have ripped them apart." Writing for IndieWire, David Ehrlich gave the film a grade of B and said, "By eschewing spectacle and focusing on the human scale of a crisis, Greenland becomes the rare disaster movie that feels realistic."

Katie Walsh of the Los Angeles Times wrote that "[the film is not just plausible but recognizable. There's very little otherworldly about this cinematic apocalypse. These are the people, places and, yes, behaviors we know all too well".

Jordan Mintzer of The Hollywood Reporter said "The gritty verisimilitude that the star and director Ric Roman Waugh bring to the table goes a long way in making this B-level blockbuster a timely and guilty pleasure". Chris Hewitt of the Star Tribune called it a "capably done [film]".

According to Matthew Monagle of The Austin Chronicle, "Greenland might be a B-movie at heart, but in keeping at least one toe on the ground at all times, the filmmakers craft something that punches well above its weight class".

The criticism of the film, just like its praise, was abundant as well. Ignatiy Vishnevetsky of The A.V. Club compared Greenland to Roland Emmerich's films, while Owen Gleiberman of Variety wrote "A thriller isn't supposed to be a cakewalk; if it were, it wouldn't thrill".

Sequel
In June 2021, it was announced a sequel titled Greenland: Migration was in development, and will reportedly center on the Garritys' journey across a frozen European wasteland to find a new home. The following month, STX acquired the worldwide distribution rights for the film at 2021 Cannes Film Festival for $75 million, and agreed to give the sequel a $65 million budget.

References

External links
 
 

2020s disaster films
American disaster films
Apocalyptic films
Films directed by Ric Roman Waugh
Films postponed due to the COVID-19 pandemic
Films scored by David Buckley
Films shot in Atlanta
STX Entertainment films
Films about families
Films set in Atlanta
Films set in Canada
Films set in Greenland
Films set in Kentucky
Films set in New York (state)
Films set in the United States
Films about impact events
Comets in film
Films produced by Basil Iwanyk
Thunder Road Films films
2020s English-language films
Disaster thriller films
2020s American films
Films set in bunkers